Hypercycle may refer to:
 Hypercycle (chemistry), a kind of reaction network prominent in a theory of the self-organization of matter
 Hypercycle (geometry), a curve in hyperbolic space whose points have the same orthogonal distance from a given straight line